Samia Hireche (born 26 August 1976) is an Algerian rower. She competed in the women's single sculls event at the 1996 Summer Olympics in Atlanta and the 2000 Summer Olympics in Sydney.

References

Algerian female rowers
Rowers at the 1996 Summer Olympics
Rowers at the 2000 Summer Olympics
Olympic rowers of Algeria
1976 births
Living people
21st-century Algerian people